Mausund is a small fishing village in the municipality of Frøya in Trøndelag county, Norway. In 2017, there were 177 residents living in Mausund.

The village is located on the small islands of Måøya, Gårdsøya, Geitøya, and Aursøyan, which are all connected by bridges.  It is a fishing village with a fish processing plant.  The Måøy Chapel is also located here.

Media gallery

References

Villages in Trøndelag
Frøya, Trøndelag